Riverside Historic District may refer to:

 Riverside Historic District (Jacksonsville, Florida), listed on the NRHP in Florida
 Riverside Historic District (Riverside, Illinois), a National Historic Landmark District in Illinois
 Riverside Historic District (Evansville, Indiana), listed on the NRHP in Indiana
 Riverside Historic District (Muncie, Indiana), listed on the NRHP in Indiana
 Licking Riverside Historic District, Covington, Kentucky, listed on the NRHP in Kentucky
 Riverside Drive Historic District, Covington, Kentucky, listed on the NRHP in Kentucky
 Riverside Historic District (Baltimore, Maryland), listed on the NRHP in Maryland
 Riverside, Charles County, Maryland, listed in the Maryland Inventory of Historic Properties
 Riverside Historic District (Elizabeth City, North Carolina), listed on the NRHP in North Carolina
 Riverside Historic District (New Bern, North Carolina), listed on the NRHP in North Carolina
 Riverside Historic Residential District, listed on the NRHP in Tulsa County, Oklahoma